Tom Cooper (born 18 February 1987, Oxford) is an English rugby union footballer. A centre, he played for Bedwas RFC and the Newport Gwent Dragons regional team. Cooper made his debut for the Newport Gwent Dragons against Gloucester on 4 November 2010. He was released by Newport Gwent Dragons at the end of the 2010–11 Magners League. He then went on to play for the Cornish Pirates in the RFU Championship during the 2011-12 season, making 16 appearances. Tom signed to play for Jersey for the 2012-13 season, again in the RFU Championship.

References

External links
Newport Gwent Dragons profile
Cornish Pirates profile
Jersey R.F.C Website

1987 births
Living people
Bedwas RFC players
Cornish Pirates players
Dragons RFC players
English rugby union players
Rugby union players from Oxford
Rugby union centres